Wim Mertens (born 14 May 1953) is a Flemish Belgian composer, countertenor vocalist, pianist, guitarist, and musicologist.

Life and work
Mertens was born in Neerpelt, Belgium. He studied social and political science at the University of Leuven (graduating in 1975) and musicology at Ghent University; he also studied music theory and piano at the Ghent Conservatory and the Royal Conservatory of Brussels.

In 1978, he became a producer at the BRT (Belgian Radio and Television, now called Vlaamse Radio- en Televisieomroep). For Radio 2 (Radio Brabant) he produced concerts by Philip Glass, Steve Reich, Terry Riley, Meredith Monk, Urban Sax and others, and hosted a program called Funky Town together with Gust De Meyer (with whom he recorded the experimental album For Amusement Only).

Known primarily as a composer since the early 1980s, Mertens began developing a reputation after releasing "Struggle for Pleasure", under the name of his early ensemble Soft Verdict, and for "Maximizing the Audience", which was composed for Jan Fabre's play The Power of Theatrical Madness, which premiered in 1984 in Venice, Italy.

Mertens' style has continually evolved during the course of his prolific career, starting from downright experimental and avant-garde, always gravitating around minimalism, usually, however, preserving a melodic foundation to the forays that he makes into the worlds that he is exploring. His compositional quality has often overweighted the "labelling issue" and reached wider audiences although stemming from a far-from-mainstream musical context (see section In popular culture). One can follow three separate threads of musical styles throughout his work: 
 Compositions for ensemble, perhaps his most accessible and "commercial" material; 
 Solo piano and voice compositions, which features haunting keyboard melodies accompanied by Mertens' unique high-pitched tenor voice singing in an invented, personal language; and 
 Experimental minimalist "cycles" for single, dual, and sometimes more instruments.

Mertens has released more than 60 albums to date, the majority of which were issued by Les Disques du Crépuscule from 1980 until 2004. Mertens also produced a number of Crépuscule releases and consulted with the label on its choice of works by contemporary composers such as Michael Nyman, Gavin Bryars, and Glenn Branca. Mertens also curated a series of releases for a Crépuscle imprint, Lome Armé, that featured works from the classical era as well as contemporary jazz.

In August 2007 Mertens signed a contract with EMI Classics (now Warner Classics) for his entire catalog. The label re-released his entire back-catalog beginning in January 2008. EMI Music Belgium also released Mertens' new work, beginning with the 9-track album Receptacle on 24 September 2007. For this album Mertens decided to work with an orchestra consisting of only women, 17 in total. It is not the first time that Mertens worked with EMI. Already in 1999, Mertens released the soundtrack to the Paul Cox film Molokai: The Story of Father Damien via EMI Classics.

Mertens is the author of American Minimal Music, which looks at the school of American repetitive music and the work of LaMonte Young, Terry Riley, Steve Reich, and Philip Glass.

In popular culture
 With that same title, the collection of electronic music Café del Mar features in its 5th volume "Close Cover", one of the most melodic and, in a way, classical pieces of the author.
 "Struggle for Pleasure" was directly covered by Belgian dance music project Minimalistix in 2000 and reached the Top 40 in the charts in many European countries including the United Kingdom, Belgium and the Netherlands. The group also did a successful cover of, again, "Close Cover".
 A cover appeared in 2001 on Gatecrasher Digital.  Elastica presents Jesus Elices 'Maximizing the Audience'.
 The James Bond novel High Time to Kill (Raymond Benson, 1999) contains a passing reference to the music of Wim Mertens, in which characters in the novel comment on the music playing in a cafe. Benson, the fourth official James Bond novelist, is a fan of Mertens' music. The reference is somewhat ironic given the interest in James Bond culture shown by Michel Duval, the founder of Les Disques du Crépuscule.
 "Struggle for Pleasure" also inspired one of the most influential electronic dance music tracks – Energy 52's trance music project called "Café Del Mar", first released on Eye Q Records in 1993. It became a successful hit in 1997 with Three 'n One remix, and Nalin & Kane remixes in 1998. In April 2011, the song was voted number one in Pete Tong's Top 20 Dance Tracks of the last 20 years.
 "Struggle for Pleasure" is often used in advertisements of Belgian telecommunications provider Proximus.
 His song "Iris" was used as the soundtrack for the Swedish Armed Forces’ commercial campaign "Vi lämnar Sverige ifred" (”We leave Sweden at peace") during the autumn-winter of 2017.

Discography
 
- Soft Verdict (by Wim Mertens & Herman Lemahieu as a duo music composers (1982-1985 are the 1st 4 years from Wim Mertens' music career):
 1982 – For Amusement Only – The Sound of Pinball Machines (full album)
 1982 – Vergessen (full album)
 1983 – Struggle for Pleasure* (album)
 1984 – A Visiting Card (EP album)
 1985 – Usura* (full album)
 1985 – Maximizing the Audience (album)

- Wim Mertens (per 1986 is Wim Mertens a solo music composer without Herman Lemahieu):
 1986 – Close Cover (with songs from the band Soft Verdict, where it all started for him)
 1986 – A Man of no Fortune, and with a Name to Come
 1986 – Hirose
 1986 – Instrumental Songs
 1987 – Educes Me**
 1987 – The Belly of an Architect
 1988 – Whisper Me
 1988 – After Virtue
 1989 – Motives for Writing
 1990 – No Testament
 1990 – Play for Me
 1991 – Alle Dinghe - pt. I: Sources of Sleeplessness
 1991 – Alle Dinghe - pt. II: Vita Brevis
 1991 – Alle Dinghe - pt. III: Alle Dinghe
 1991 – Stratégie De La Rupture'
 1991 – Hufhuf [single taken from Stratégie de la Rupture with ***Previously Unreleased Track(s)
 1992 – Houfnice 1992 – Retrospectives - vol. 1 1992 – Shot and Echo (with Herman Lemahieu & other musicians as the music players only)
 1993 – A Sense of Place 1994 – Epic That Never Was (a live recording from Lissabon)
 1994 – Gave van Niets - promo only 1994 – Gave van Niets - pt. I: You'll Never be Me 1994 – Gave van Niets - Part II: Divided Loyalties 1994 – Gave van Niets - pt. III: Gave van Niets 1994 – Gave van Niets - pt. IV: Reculer pour Mieux Sauter 1995 – Jeremiades 1996 – Entre Dos Mares 1996 – Lisa 1996 – Jardin Clos 1996 – Piano & Voice 1997 – Sin Embargo 1997 – Best of 1998 – In 3 or 4 Days (single taken from "Integer Valor" with PUT***)
 1998 – Integer Valor (with Herman Lemahieu & other musicians as the music player only)
 1998 – Integer Valor - integral (with Herman Lemahieu  & other musician as the music players only)
 1998 – And Bring You Back 1999 – Father Damien 1999 – Integer Valor – Intégrale 1999 – Kere Weerom - pt. I: Poema 1999 – Kere Weerom - pt. II: Kere Weerom 1999 – Kere Weerom - pt. III: Decorum 2000 – If I Can 2000 – Der Heisse Brei 2001 – At Home – Not at Home 2001 – Aren Lezen - promo only 2001 – Aren Lezen - pt. I: If Five is Part of Ten 2001 – Aren Lezen - pt. II: Aren Lezen 2001 – Aren Lezen - pt. III: Kaosmos 2001 – Aren Lezen - pt. IV: aRe 2002 – Years without History - vol. 1 – Moins de Mètre, Assez de Rythme 2002 – Years without History - vol. 2 – In the Absence of Hindrance 2002 – Years without History - vol. 3 – Cave Musicam 2002 – Wim Mertens Moment 2003 – Years without History - vol. 4 – No Yet, no Longer 2003 – Skopos 2004 – Years without History - vol. 5 – With no Need for Seeds 2004 – Shot and Echo (with Herman Lemahieu  & other musician as the music players only)/A Sense of Place (with PUT***) (2-CD)
 2005 – Un Respiro 2006 – Partes Extra Partes 2007 – Receptacle 2008 – Platinum Collection 2008 – l'Heure du loup 2008 – Years without History - vol. 1–6 (vol. 6 is only available at this set)
 2008 – Years without History - vol. 7: Nosotros 2009 – Music and Film (3-CD set with PUT***)
 2009 – The World Tout Court 2009 – QUA (37-CD reissue set of the extended cycle works Alle Dinghe, Gave van Niets, Kere Weerom and Aren Lezen) 
 2010 – Zee versus Zed 2011 – Series of Ands/Immediate Givens (2-CD double album)
 2011 – Open Continuum/Tenerife Symphony Orchestra (OST) (2-CD + 1-DVD)
 2012 – *Struggle for Pleasure (only by Soft Verdict - NOT by Wim Mertens solo music composer)/**Double Entendre (ONLY by Wim Mertens as solo music composer): 1-CD reissue with 2 albums on one CD + one CD with PUT*** (3-CD set).
 2012 – A Starry Wisdom 2012 – When Tool met Wood 2015 – Charaktersketch 2016 – What are we, locks, to do? 2016 – Dust of Truths 2017 – Cran aux Œufs 2017 - Nature's Largess (live)
 2018 – That Which is Not 2019 - Certain Nuances Excepted (live)
 2019 - Inescapable (4-CD compilation)
 2020 - The Gaze of the West 2022 - Heroides''

References

External links
 
 
 Wim Mertens Official - YouTube at Wim Mertens Official (YouTube)
 Wim Mertens at Wim Mertens Official (Facebook)
 
 
 Interview with Wim Mertens on the Cerysmatic Factory Soundcloud page
 

1953 births
People from Neerpelt
20th-century classical composers
21st-century classical composers
Belgian film score composers
Male film score composers
Living people
Postmodern composers
Ghent University alumni
Catholic University of Leuven alumni
Royal Conservatory of Brussels alumni
Windham Hill Records artists
EMI Classics and Virgin Classics artists
Factory Records artists
Minimalist composers
21st-century Belgian male singers
21st-century Belgian singers
20th-century Belgian male singers
20th-century Belgian singers
20th-century Belgian pianists
Belgian male guitarists